Raj Gauthaman is a leading Tamil intellectual who pioneered new approaches to Tamil cultural and literary history studies in the late 20th century. He has authored twenty research works that analyze the development of Tamil culture from ancient to modern periods with a focus on subaltern Dalit perspectives. He has also written three novels and translated Sanskrit works into Tamil. Raj Gauthaman was a part of the core group of writers and thinkers, many of whom were Dalits, which shaped the thinking of the influential journal, Nirapirikai in the early 1990s. He worked in academia  before retiring in 2011.

Raj Gauthaman was awarded the Pudhumaipithan Ninaivu Virudhu by the Canadian and American Tamil diaspora in 2018. He is being awarded the Vishnupuram Award for 2018 by the Vishnupuram Ilakkiya Vattam for his significant contributions to the Tamil literary and cultural domain.

Biography
Raj Gauthaman was born in 1950 in Pudhupatti town in Virudhu Nagar district of Tamil Nadu. His original name was S Pushparaj. He obtained elementary education in Pudhupatti and high school education in Madurai. He attended St Xavier's college in Palayamkottai and received graduate degree in Zoology and post-graduate degree in Tamil literature. He then attended Annamalai University and received a post-graduate degree in Sociology. He completed his PhD based on research on writer A Madhaviah.

Raj Gauthaman was associated with government arts colleges in Pondicherry, and was lastly the Head of the Tamil Department at the Kanchi Mamunivar Centre for Postgraduate Studies in Pondicherry. and retired in 2011. His wife's name is K Parimalam, and his daughter is Dr Nivedha. He currently resides in Tirunelveli

Raj Gauthaman is the elder brother of the celebrated Tamil novelist Bama. He wrote the foreword to her first collection of stories, Kusumbukkaran.

Gauthaman cites among his formative influences the works of Ranajit Guha, Bakhtin, Foucault and Nietzsche.

Career

Early works
Raj Gauthaman was closely associated with the wave of Dalit political thought and writing that rose in the 1980s in India and in Tamil Nadu. He published essays and articles that analyzed Tamil culture in subaltern perspectives through a Marxian approach. The energy of Tamil Dalit movement and Gauthaman's distinct contribution to it is captured in two widely cited early works, Dalit Panpaadu (Dalit Culture, 1993) and Dalit Paarvaiyil Tamil Panpaadu (Tamil Culture from a Dalit Perspective, 1994). He also published Iyothee Thassar Ayvugal on scholar Iyothee Thass and Aram Adhikaram. Marxist scholars like N Muthumohan praise the works for their blend of Marxian analysis and satire.

Writer and critic Jeyamohan in his introductory note for the Vishnupuram Award contends that while his early works projected critical intensity and satire, they generally lacked the integrity of his later works. Jeyamohan remarks that Raj Gauthaman should primarily be known as one of the three stalwarts of Tamil literary history studies.

Dalit Paarvaiyil Tamil Panpaadu (1994) argues that analyzed carefully from below, mainstream Tamil culture reveals itself, not as a unified expression of Tamil achievement, but as comprising heterogeneous strands. It is in many ways a critique of the canonized non-Brahmin version of the Tamil past. Gauthaman's narrative is interrupted at specific points by an ordinary Dalit who brings in the freshness of a local dialect to question and comment on the account. At one point the Dalit interlocutor asks why students are never taught these things. The answer, 'they say such things are not interesting; literature has to be appreciated and enjoyed; it is not politics,' opens out onto another major achievement of these books and of the Nirapirikai group — the repositioning of literary and cultural texts outside the confines of the aesthetic.

Later phase
Jeyamohan classifies Raj Gauthaman's works in the post-2000 period as more rounded and reflecting the balance necessary to explore ancient Tamil history and culture.

Pattum Thogaiyum Tholkappiyamum Thamizh Samooga Uruvakkamum traced the cultural foundations of Tamil society through Tamil Sangam literature and Tholkappiyam. It explored how Tamil society consolidated its patterns of 'righteousness based hegemony', and how it used power to create prevailing social hierarchies over time.

Aakol Poosalum Perungarkaala Nagarigamum analyzed how the tribal society transformed into the urban village of the Sangam area, and how those boundaries slowly got blurred, affecting the lives and equations of participants on both sides. It charted unexplored areas on how wars gave way to games of cattle robbery, the changing role of the bards and pleasure women and the funerary customs of megalithic versus 'civilized' era.

Aarambakatta Mudhalaliyamum Thamizh Samooga Uruvakkamum describes and explores the late 19th century social and cultural milieu where those social groups which collaborated with the British rule were allowed to experience private land and property ownership. This included Dalit social groups which were newly unencumbered from slavery and started to enjoy property rights and urban mobility.

Raj Gauthaman's novel Siluvairaj Sarithiram was a satirical take on society through the eyes of a Dalit across twenty five years of his life. It is written in an autobiographical style and describes Siluvai's encounters with political, social and religious institutions.

Bibliography

Research and criticism
 A Madhavaiah
 Enbadhugalil Thamizh Kalaacharam(1992)
 Dalit Panpaadu (Dalit Culture, 1993) 
 Dalit Paarvaiyil Tamil Panpaadu (Tamil Culture from a Dalit Perspective, 1994)
 K Iyothee Thassar ayvugal, research on early Dalit activist Iyothee Thassar
 Aram Adhikaram
 Dalitiya Vimarsana Katturaigal (2003)
 Pattum Thogaiyum Tholkappiyamum Thamizh Samooga Uruvakkamum (2008)
 Thamizh Samoogathil Aramum Aatralum (2008)
 Aakol poosalum Perungarkaala Naagarigamum (2010)
 Aarambakatta Mudhalaliyamum Thamizh Samooga Uruvakkamum (2010)
 Kanmoodi Vazhakkam Ellam Manmoodi Poga
 Kalithogai Paripaadal: Oru Vilimbunilai Nokku
 Pudhumaipithan Ennum Brahmaraakshas
 Poi + Abatham = Unmai
 Penniyam: Varalarum Kotpadugalum
 Pathitruppatthu Aingurunooru
 Pazhanthamizh Agaval Padalgalin Parimatram
 Sundara Ramasamy: Karuthum Kalaiyum
 Vallalarin Aanmeega Payanam

Fiction
 Siluvairaj Sarithiram
 Kaalachumai (2003)
 Londonil Siluvairaj

Translation
 Vilimbunilai Makkalin Porattangal (translated into Tamil, from the original by Ranajit Guha and Susie Tharu)
 Kilikkathaigal Ezhupathu (translation of Śukasaptati, Seventy Tales of the Parrot)
 Anbu Enum Kalai
 Kathakosa: Samana Kathaigal

Further reading 
 Satyanarayana, K & Tharu, Susie (2011) No Alphabet in Sight: New Dalit Writing from South Asia, Dossier 1: Tamil and Malayalam, New Delhi: Penguin Books.
 Satyanarayana, K & Tharu, Susie (2013) From those Stubs Steel Nibs are Sprouting: New Dalit Writing from South Asia, Dossier 2: Kannada and Telugu, New Delhi: HarperCollins India.
 Jeyamohan, (2018), Raj Gauthamanin Panpattu Varalatru Paarvai, Article series critiquing Raj Gauthaman's contribution to Tamil cultural history studies, www.jeyamohan.in

References 

Dalit writers
Tamil writers
Living people
1950 births